Jeziorki may refer to:

Jeziorki, Brodnica County in Kuyavian-Pomeranian Voivodeship (north-central Poland)
Jeziorki, Świecie County in Kuyavian-Pomeranian Voivodeship (north-central Poland)
Jeziorki, Mogilno County in Kuyavian-Pomeranian Voivodeship (north-central Poland)
Jeziorki, Augustów County in Podlaskie Voivodeship (north-east Poland)
Jeziorki, Sejny County in Podlaskie Voivodeship (north-east Poland)
Jeziorki, Suwałki County in Podlaskie Voivodeship (north-east Poland)
Jeziorki, Świętokrzyskie Voivodeship (south-central Poland)
Jeziorki, Leszno County in Greater Poland Voivodeship (west-central Poland)
Jeziorki, Piła County in Greater Poland Voivodeship (west-central Poland)
Jeziorki, Poznań County in Greater Poland Voivodeship (west-central Poland)
Jeziorki, Wągrowiec County in Greater Poland Voivodeship (west-central Poland)
Jeziorki, Lubusz Voivodeship (west Poland)
Jeziorki, Pomeranian Voivodeship (north Poland)
Jeziorki, Kołobrzeg County in West Pomeranian Voivodeship (north-west Poland)
Jeziorki, Szczecinek County in West Pomeranian Voivodeship (north-west Poland)
Jeziorki, Wałcz County in West Pomeranian Voivodeship (north-west Poland)